The Theosophical Glossary by Helena Blavatsky was first published in 1892. Some other important theosophical glossaries are the Encyclopedic Theosophical Glossary by Gottfried de Purucker and the Collation of Theosophical Glossaries.

List of some other theosophical glossaries 
 EG | Encyclopedic Theosophical Glossary - 1999 | G. de Purucker, ed.
 FY | Five Years of Theosophy - 1885 | H. P. Blavatsky, ed.
 GH | Gods and Heroes of the Bhagavad Gita - 1939 | Geoffrey A. Barborka
 IN | An Invitation to the Secret Doctrine - 1988 | Grace F. Knoche, ed.
 IU | Isis Unveiled - 1877 | H. P. Blavatsky
 KT | Key to Theosophy - 1889 | H. P. Blavatsky
 MO | The Masks of Odin - 1985 | Elsa-Brita Titchenell
 OG | Occult Glossary - 1933, 1996 | G. de Purucker
 PV | Esotericism of the Popol Vuh | Raphael Girard (glossary by Blair A. Moffett)
 SD INDEX | Index to The Secret Doctrine - 1997 | John P. Van Mater
 SF | Search and Find - 1978 | Elsie Benjamin
 SK | Sanskrit Keys the Wisdom Religion - 1940 | Judith Tyberg
 SKf | Sanskrit terms from Fundamentals of the Esoteric Philosophy, by G. de Purucker, 1932.
 SKo | Sanskrit terms from The Ocean of Theosophy, by William Q. Judge, 1893.
 SKs | Sanskrit terms from The Secret Doctrine, by H. P. Blavatsky, 1888.
 SKv | Sanskrit terms from The Voice of the Silence, by H. P. Blavatsky, 1889.
 SP | Sanskrit Pronunciation - 1992 | Bruce Cameron Hall
 TG | Theosophical Glossary - 1892 | H. P. Blavatsky
 VS | Voice of the Silence - 1889 | H. P. Blavatsky
 WG | The Working Glossary - 1892 | W. Q. Judge
 WGa | Terms from The Working Glossary Appendix
 WW | Word Wisdom in the Esoteric Tradition - 1980 | G. de Purucker

External links
 Encyclopedic Theosophical Glossary
 Collation of Theosophical Glossaries

Glossaries
1892 non-fiction books
Theosophy